Eduard Ichon (27 December 1879  - 19 January 1943 in Bremen) was a German director and theatre director, who was founder and director of the Schauspielhaus in Bremen. He is buried at Riensberg Cemetery in Bremen.

References

Literature

German theatre directors
1879 births
1943 deaths
Mass media people from Bremen